The 2000 Gael Linn Cup, the most important representative competition for elite level participants in the women's team field sport of camogie, was won by Connacht, who defeated Ulster in the final, played at Bohernabreena. It was the only time these two provinces met in the final. Therese Maher of Connacht and Siobhán Convery of Ulster were named Schwarzkopf senior and junior players of the tournament.

Arrangements
The tournament at St Anne's, Boheranbreena produced an unusual final pairing between the two weaker provinces for the first time, Ulster defeated Leinster 3–15 to 1–12. Connacht defeated Munster 2–12 to 0–11 and Ulster in the final 3–10 to 0–3 to win their first title since 1974 and third in all.

Gael Linn Trophy
Ulster defeated Leinster 3–9 to 1–8. Munster defeated Connacht 7–18 to 0–8. Ulster defeated Munster 1–10 to 2–6 in the final.

Final stages

|}

Junior Final

|}

References

External links
 Camogie Association

2000 in camogie
2000